Josef Franc (born 18 January 1979, in Čáslav, Czech Republic) is a former international motorcycle racer who competed in Grasstrack, Longtrack and motorcycle speedway.

Career
He has appeared as a track reserve in the 2007 Czech Republic Speedway Grand Prix, scoring three points from two rides and has represented the Czech Republic national speedway team at senior level.

Franc was the Czech Republic Under-21 Champion in 1999 and was the Czech Republic national champion in 2017 and 2018.

Speedway Grand Prix results 

 2003, Prague SGP, 0 Points.
 2007, Prague SGP, 3 Points.
 2012, Prague SGP, 9 Points.

Career details

World Championships 
 Individual World Championship and Speedway Grand Prix
 2003 - 45th place (1 pt in one event)
 2007 - 28th place (3 pts in one event)
 Team World Championship (Speedway World Team Cup and Speedway World Cup)
 2003 - 6th place (started in Event 1 only)
 2004 - 6th place
 2006 - 8th place
 2007 - 2nd place in Qualifying round 2
 Individual U-21 World Championship
 1999 -  Vojens - did not start as track reserve
 2000 -  Gorzów Wlkp. - 6th place (8 pts)

European Championships 

 Individual European Championship
 2002 -  Rybnik - 14th place (5 pts)
 2003 -  Slaný - did not start as track reserve
 2007 - 13th place in Qualifying Round 3
 2008 -  Lendava - 6th place (10 pts)
 Individual U-19 European Championship
 1998 -  Krško - 8th place (8 pts)
 European Club Champions' Cup
 2004 -  Ljubljana - 4th place (10 pts)

World Longtrack Championship 

Grand-Prix Years

 1999 1 app (23rd) 4pts
 2010 1 app (18th) 19pts
 2011 6 app (13th) 51pts
 2012 6 app (Third) 126pts
 2013 6 app (4th) 91pts
 2014 4 app (10th) 32pts
 2015 4 app (5th) 53pts
 2016 5 app (7th) 55pts
 2017 5 app (Third) 86pts

Best Grand-Prix Results

  Eenrum Second 2017
  Forssa Second 2012
  Groningen First 2012
  Marmande Second 2012
  Morizes First 2012, Second 2017
  Rzeszow Third 2013

Team Championship
 2010  Morizes (6th) 9/25pts (Rode with Zdenek Schneiderwind, Richard Wolff, Pavel Ondrasik).
 2011  Scheeßel (4th) 21/36pts (Rode with Ales Dryml jnr, Richard Wolff, Pavel Ondrasik).
 2012  St. Macaire (5th) 16/30 (Rode with Ales Dryml jnr, Richard Wolff, Michael Hadek).
 2013  Folkestone (7th) 11/23pts (Rode with Richard Wolff, Karel Kadlec).
 2014  Forssa (6th) 13/23pts (Rode with Richard Wolff, Jan Klatovsky).
 2015  Mühldorf (6th) 18/30pts (Rode with Richard Wolff, Michal Dudek, Michal Skurla).
 2016  Marianske Lazne (Third) 18/42pts (Rode with Hynek Stichauer, Martin Malek).
 2017  Roden (4th) 28/43pts (Rode with Hynek Stichauer, Martin Malek).
 2018  Morizes (5th) 20/32pts (rode with Martin Malek, Michal Skurla).

European Grasstrack Championship

Finalist

 1999  Werlte (16th) 1pt
 2011  Thorpe St Peter (17th) 4pts
 2012  Eenrum (Reserve N/S)
 2013  Bielefeld (9th) 13pts
 2014  St. Macaire (4th) 13pts
 2015  Staphorst (20th) 0pts
 2016  Folkestone (4th) 12pts
 2017  Hertingen (7th) 10pts
 2018  Tayac (Second) 15pts

Czech Longtrack Championship

 2003  Marianske Lazne 12th
 2010  Marianske Lazne Second
 2011  Marianske Lazne Second
 2012  Marianske Lazne Second
 2013  Marianske Lazne First
 2014  Marianske Lazne First
 2015  Marianske Lazne First
 2017  Marianske Lazne First
 2018  Marianske Lazne First

See also 
 Czech Republic national speedway team
 List of Speedway Grand Prix riders

References

External links 
 http://grasstrackgb.co.uk/josef-franc/

1979 births
Living people
Czech speedway riders
Berwick Bandits riders
Newcastle Diamonds riders
People from Čáslav
Individual Speedway Long Track World Championship riders
Sportspeople from the Central Bohemian Region